Solomon Worshipping Idols is a 1647 painting by Jacques Stella, inspired by his trip to Italy and influenced by his meeting with Nicolas Poussin on the journey. It and its pair Solomon Receiving the Queen of Sheba are both in the Museum of Fine Arts of Lyon.

Sources
Sylvain Kespern, Bossuet, miroir du Grand siècle, Phileas Fogg, 2004.

1647 paintings
Paintings by Jacques Stella
Paintings in the collection of the Museum of Fine Arts of Lyon
Stella
Dance in art
Musical instruments in art